Rückers is a village in the municipality of Flieden, in the district of Fulda, in Hesse, Germany.

Geography 
Rückers is situated in the south of the district of Fulda, approx. 20 km south of the town Fulda, on the gently sliding northern slope of a low mountain range between Rhön and Vogelsberg Mountains called Landrücken.

Neighboring localities 
Rückers borders in the north-east the village of Schweben, in the south-east the village of Hutten, in the south the village of Elm, in the south-west the village of Klosterhöfe, in the west the village of Höf und Haid and in the north-west the village of Flieden.

History 

Dolmens found at the foot of the Steinkammer give testimony that people already lived here already in ancient times. The founding of Rückers is expected around the time of Charlemagne. In a written document, Rückers is mentioned for the first time around the year of 1160.

Religion 
A Catholic church Mariä Himmelfahrt is situated in Rückers.

Education 
A kindergarten named St. Nikolaus and a Grundschule (elementary school) Steinkammerschule are in Rückers.

Sites of interest 
The headwater and local recreation area Steinkammer located on the low mountain range Landrücken serves vacationers and hikers a superb view to the mountains of Rhön, Vogelsberg and Spessart. The area of Steinkammer is a protected landscape area  in the Hessian Rhön Nature Park, bordering the Spessart Nature Park, with geological and biological importance.

Transportation

Motorway 
Bundesautobahn 66

Railway lines 
Line Bebra – Fulda – Frankfurt am Main
Line Flieden – Gemünden

References

External links 
official website of village Rueckers
official website of Catholic-Church-Rueckers

Fulda (district)
Villages in Hesse